ISHOF may refer to:
The International Space Hall of Fame in  Alamogordo, New Mexico, USA
The International Swimming Hall of Fame in Fort Lauderdale, Florida, USA